Syncosmia layanga is a moth in the family Geometridae. It is found on Borneo.

It is the largest species in the genus Syncosmia.

References

Moths described in 1976
Eupitheciini